Ruano (or Ruaño) may refer to:

Alexis (footballer, born 1985), full name Alexis Ruano Delgado, Spanish professional footballer
Alfredo Ruano (died 1987), football player from El Salvador
Aythami Ruano (born 1977), Spanish judoka
German Ruano (born 1971), Guatemalan football defender
Gualberto Ruaño, MD, PhD, pioneer in personalized medicine and inventor of molecular diagnostic systems for managing viral diseases
Idoia López Riaño a Basque ETA terrorist hitwoman who killed 23 persons. She was the inspiration for the TV psychopath Villanelle.
Roque Ruaño (1877–1935), Spanish priest-civil engineer
Teodora Ruano (born 1969), Spanish track and road racing cyclist
Virginia Ruano Pascual (born 1973), female Spanish professional tennis player

References